Jérémy Serwy (born 4 June 1991) is a professional footballer who plays as a midfielder for Luxembourg top tier side FC Wiltz 71.

References

External links
 
 
 
 Jérémy Serwy Interview 

1991 births
Living people
Footballers from Liège
Association football defenders
Belgian footballers
R. Charleroi S.C. players
S.V. Zulte Waregem players
RWS Bruxelles players
Borussia Dortmund II players
Újpest FC players
Fimleikafélag Hafnarfjarðar players
R.E. Virton players
US Hostert players
Belgian Pro League players
3. Liga players
Belgian expatriate footballers
Expatriate footballers in Germany
Belgian expatriate sportspeople in Germany
Expatriate footballers in Hungary
Belgian expatriate sportspeople in Hungary
Expatriate footballers in Iceland
Belgian expatriate sportspeople in Iceland
Expatriate footballers in Luxembourg
Belgian expatriate sportspeople in Luxembourg